Malton Community Hospital is a health facility in Middlecave Road, Malton, North Yorkshire, England. It is managed by York and Scarborough Teaching Hospitals NHS Foundation Trust. The community inpatient unit is run by Humber Teaching NHS Foundation Trust.

History
The land for the hospital was provided at a nominal rent by Earl Fitzwilliam. It was opened as by Countess Fitzwilliam as Malton Cottage Hospital in 1905. It joined the National Health Service in 1948 and, after becoming the Malton, Norton & District Hospital, it was the subject of a major reconfiguration in 2010. The One-Stop Urology Diagnostic Centre, situated within Malton Hospital, was opened in January 2017.

References

Official website

Hospitals established in 1905
1905 establishments in England
Hospital buildings completed in 1905
Hospitals in North Yorkshire
NHS hospitals in England
Malton, North Yorkshire